"Nevermind" is a 2016 song by Israeli musician and singer Dennis Lloyd. It is his signature song and biggest hit single to date, having accumulated over 800 million streams on Spotify and in June 2018, Time listed it as one of the "songs of summer".

Track listing

Charts

Weekly charts

Year-end charts

Certifications

References

External links
 

2016 singles
2016 songs
Dennis Lloyd songs
English-language Israeli songs
Number-one singles in Austria
Song recordings produced by Dennis Lloyd
Songs written by Dennis Lloyd